Wolfgang Schäfer (born 7 April 1945) is a German choral conductor and academic. He founded the Freiburger Vokalensemble, the BosArt Trio, and the Frankfurter Kammerchor.

Career 
Born in Staufen im Breisgau, Schäfer studied music education, voice and choral conducting in Freiburg im Breisgau, and orchestral conducting in Stuttgart. He was a teacher at the Hochschule für Musik Freiburg from 1971 to 1982.

In 1982 Schäfer was appointed professor for choral conducting at the Hochschule für Musik und Darstellende Kunst Frankfurt am Main (short: HfMDK, Frankfurt University of Music and Performing Arts), succeeding Helmuth Rilling. In that capacity he conducted both the choir and the chamber choir of the Hochschule. He performed concerts with the chamber choir of the MfMDK at the university and also in the Rhein-Main Region, such as 2007 in St. Martin, Idstein, a program of mostly psalm compositions, Das ist mir lieb (Psalm 116) by Heinrich Schütz, Warum ist das Licht gegeben dem Mühseligen? by Brahms, Eli Eli (based on Psalm 22) of Georgius Bárdos, Bruckner's Os justi (Psalm 37:19–20), and Bach's Lobet den Herrn, alle Heiden (Psalm 117). Among his students are Peter Reulein, Christoph Siebert and Dan Zerfaß. In 2008, after 26 years of teaching, he conducted in a farewell concert Schicksalslied of Brahms and Schubert's Mass in A flat major.

Also in 1982 he was the director of the Frankfurter Kantorei, succeeding Kurt Thomas and Rilling. He conducted the choir until 1997. In 2008 he founded the Frankfurter Kammerchor. Schäfer has been a juror at international music competitions. He has been the artistic director of the annual Staufener Musikwoche in his hometown. Since his student days, Schäfer has also been a member of the musical comedy group BosArt Trio.

In 1984 Schäfer conducted the premiere of the Mass of Kurt Hessenberg with the Frankfurter Kantorei in the studio of the Hessischer Rundfunk.

In 1990 he recorded Telemann's cantata Die Tageszeiten with Mechthild Bach, Mechthild Georg, Hans Peter Blochwitz, Johannes Mannov, the Freiburger Vokalensemble and Collegium Musicum, the second commercial recording of the cantata. In 2003 he recorded Telemann's Passion Das selige Erwägen des bittern Leiden und Sterbens Jesu Christi with Barbara Locher, Zeger Vandersteene, Stefan Dörr, Berthold Possemeyer, Jesus-Rene Schmidt, the Freiburger Vokalensemble and L'arpa festante, then probably the only recording of the work.

After retiring from the Musikhochschule Frankfurt, Schäfer founded the Frankfurter Kammerchor, mostly formed by alumni of the Hochschule. He conducted the chamber choir in concerts in the Limburg Cathedral, St. Martin, Idstein, and the Stiftskirche, Stuttgart, among others. He designed a program for Advent which includes several settings of Ave Maria and Jan Sandström's Es ist ein Ros entsprungen.

Awards
 1981: BBC competition "Let the Peoples Sing", first prize with the Freiburger Vokalensemble
 1984: Wettbewerb der Europäischen Rundfunkunion, first prize with the Freiburger Vokalensemble

Discography
Freiburger Vokalensemble
 Anton Bruckner: Motetten. EOM, Freiburg 1980
 Das deutsche Chorlied um 1600. Christophorus, Freiburg 1982
 Anton Bruckner: Motetten. Christophorus, Freiburg 1984
 Hector Berlioz: Lélio. Radio-Sinfonie-Orchester Frankfurt, Eliahu Inbal. Denon, 1987
 Georg Philipp Telemann: Die Tageszeiten. BMG Ariola, Hamburg 1990
 Cristóbal de Morales: Geistliche Werke. Christophorus, Freiburg 1990
 Johannes Brahms: Zigeunerlieder. Sonomaster, Stuttgart 1991
 Johannes Brahms: Deutsche Volkslieder. Bayer, Bietigheim-Bissingen 1996
 Musik-Dokumente 1970 - 2003 aus der Freiburger Pauluskirche. Notabene, Freiburg 2003
 Georg Philipp Telemann: Das selige Erwägen des bittern Leidens und Sterbens Jesu Christi. Sonomaster, Stuttgart 2003
 Joseph Rheinberger: Vom Goldenen Horn. Carus, Stuttgart 2005
 Conradin Kreutzer: Goethes „Faust“. Gesänge. ARTS

Frankfurter Kantorei
 Arthur Honegger: Le Roi David. Christophorus, Freiburg 1985
 Gustav Mahler: Symphony No. 3. Radio-Sinfonie-Orchester Frankfurt, Eliahu Inbal. Denon, Ratingen 1987
 Hector Berlioz: Lélio. Radio-Sinfonie-Orchester Frankfurt, Eliahu Inbal. Denon, 1987
 Igor Stravinsky: Les noces; Carl Orff: Catulli carmina. Koch, München 1990
 Harald Genzmer: Deutsche Messe. Cappella, Wiesbaden 1993
 Antonín Dvořák: Mass in D major. Freiburger Musik-Forum, Freiburg 1993
 Joseph Rheinberger: Mass in F minor; Sechs religiöse Gesänge; Requiem in d-Moll. Stuttgart, Carus 1998
 Felix Mendelssohn: Die erste Walpurgisnacht. Städtisches Opernhaus- und Museumsorchester, Sylvain Cambreling. Frankfurter Museums-Gesellschaft 2001

BosArt Trio
 Unerhörte Meisterwerke. 1984
 Ein Schluck aus dem Opernglas. 1987
 Scherzo wie Watsche. 1991
 Musik von A bis Zett. 1994
 Insalata Mista. 1998
 Die Fledermaus und das Phantom. 2000
 Bach Blüten. 2001

References

External links 
 Wolfgang Schaefer Frankfurter Kantorei
 Wolfgang Schäfer Frankfurter Kammerchor (in German)
 BosArt Trio website (in German)
 Freiburger Vokalensemble (Chamber Choir) on bach-cantatas

1945 births
Living people
People from Staufen im Breisgau
German choral conductors
German male conductors (music)
Academic staff of the Frankfurt University of Music and Performing Arts
Academic staff of the Hochschule für Musik Freiburg
21st-century German conductors (music)
21st-century German male musicians